The 1966–67 Nationalliga A season was the 29th season of the Nationalliga A, the top level of ice hockey in Switzerland. 10 teams participated in the league, and EHC Kloten won the championship.

First round

Final round

Relegation

External links
 Championnat de Suisse 1966/67

National League (ice hockey) seasons
Swiss
1966–67 in Swiss ice hockey